Casto Espinosa Barriga (born 18 June 1982), known simply as Casto, is a Spanish former professional footballer who played as a goalkeeper.

Club career
Born in Pueblonuevo del Guadiana, Province of Badajoz, Extremadura, Casto spent four years at local Mérida UD (formative spell included), making seven league appearances for the seniors in the Segunda División B. In 2003, he moved to CD Logroñés where he played one season before joining Albacete Balompié of Segunda División, featuring in one match for the first team in 2005–06.

Casto signed with Real Betis in the summer of 2006, where he initially began as third-choice behind Pedro Contreras and Toni Doblas. With the arrival of Portuguese international Ricardo in the following campaign, it seemed as though he would be provided with little opportunity to shine, even with Contreras' departure. However, after a serious injury to Doblas, he was called up from the reserves; after Ricardo also went down with a minor ailment, he made his debut in La Liga on 16 December 2007, against UD Almería in a 3–1 home win.

In March/April 2008 Casto, who eventually overtook Ricardo as starter after the latter's recovery, featured in Betis' first three back-to-back victories in over two years, with wins over CA Osasuna, FC Barcelona and Real Zaragoza. In his first five games they won four, with the player keeping clean sheets in three.

As coach Paco Chaparro stayed on the bench for 2008–09, Casto won the battle for first-choice over Ricardo, being the side's undisputed starter during the early stages, a situation which would revert midway through the season. He started often after Ricardo's departure to Leicester City, only being overtaken by Adrián in 2012–13.

Casto left the Verdiblancos after his contract expired, and resumed his career in the second tier, representing Real Murcia, UD Las Palmas, UD Almería, AD Alcorcón and Extremadura UD. With the latter side, he spent the first half of the 2018–19 campaign unregistered as it had surpassed the agreed salary cap.

With Extremadura back in division three, Casto was released in January 2022 due to the club's severe financial problems. The following month, the 39-year-old announced his retirement.

Career statistics

Club

References

External links

1982 births
Living people
People from Tierra de Badajoz
Sportspeople from the Province of Badajoz
Spanish footballers
Footballers from Extremadura
Association football goalkeepers
La Liga players
Segunda División players
Segunda División B players
Tercera División players
Primera Federación players
Mérida UD footballers
CD Logroñés footballers
Atlético Albacete players
Albacete Balompié players
Betis Deportivo Balompié footballers
Real Betis players
Real Murcia players
UD Las Palmas players
UD Almería players
AD Alcorcón footballers
Extremadura UD footballers